Goodna railway station is located on the Main line in Queensland, Australia. It serves the Ipswich suburb of Goodna. It opened in 1874 at the same time the line opened.

Goodna is served by City network services operating from Caboolture and Bowen Hills to Ipswich and Rosewood.

The station underwent repair work in 2011 to compensate flood damage to signalling and station amenities after the platform became completely submerged underwater during the 2011 floods.

Services
Goodna is served by trains operating to and from Ipswich and Rosewood. Most city-bound services run to Caboolture and Nambour, with some morning peak trains terminating at Bowen Hills. Some afternoon inbound services on weekdays run to Kippa-Ring. Goodna is twenty minutes from Ipswich and 36 minutes on an all-stops train from Central.

Services by platform

*Note: One weekday morning service (4:56am from Central) and selected afternoon peak services continue through to Rosewood.  At all other times, a change of train is required at Ipswich.

Transport links
Westside Bus Company operate four routes to and from Goodna station:
463: to Forest Lake
500: to Riverlink Shopping Centre
522: to Springfield Central
524: to Redbank Plains

References

External links

[ Goodna station] TransLink
Goodna station Queensland's Railways on the Internet

Railway stations in Ipswich City
Railway stations in Australia opened in 1874
Goodna, Queensland
Main Line railway, Queensland